Stax Music Academy is an after school and summer music school in South Memphis, Tennessee. The program has included instruction from many prominent musicians. Alumni include Kris Thomas, a top ten contender on The Voice and Kirby Lauryen, a Roc Nation songwriter and performing artist who was a winner of the 2017 "ASCAP Women Behind the Music" Award and is the first graduate to serve on the board of directors of the Soulsville Foundation.

 
The Soulsville Foundation operates Stax Music Academy and the adjacent Stax Museum at 926 McLemore Avenue in the former location of Stax Records. The original building, a converted movie theatre where artists such as Otis Redding, Isaac Hayes, Booker T. & the MGs, Sam & Dave, and many others  recorded in the '60s and '70s, was torn down. It was reconstructed along with a reconstructed Satellite Record Shop and is the only museum in the United States to be devoted entirely to soul music. The foundation also operate The Soulsville Charter School. All three distinct but connected entities share the same campus.

At Stax Music Academy, a registered 501 (c) (3), a group of professional musicians/instructors instill soul in the next generation of Memphis artists. Stax Music Academy students take classes in music theory, preparing them to read music with proficiency, read and perform all twelve major and minor scales, and apply harmonic analysis to a musical selection. Students are required to participate in moderated juries at the end of each semester that tests both their performance acumen and their western theoretical grasp of music. Students learn the art of storytelling and composition to create their own music plus music business to assure each young artist understands how to make a living in music. Success is defined individually for each student,

Stax Music Academy programs teach more than notes, however. It helps students enhance their character by teaching skills in leadership, teamwork, and discipline. The end goal is to prepare graduates for post-primary success regardless of path, whether it be attending college or entering the music workforce.

Since its founding, Stax Music Academy has graduated more than 4,000 students. Since 2008, every high school senior has been accepted to a college or university, many on full scholarships. Academy alumni can be heard around the world, teaching, performing, recording, and more at the highest levels of the music industry.

As it prepares to celebrate its 20th anniversary in 2020, Stax Music continues to contribute to the new Memphis sound through the music from current students and alumni.

HISTORY

The Stax Music Academy began programming on June 1, 2000 in a nearby elementary school while its permanent facility was under construction. On July 24, 2002, the ribbon was cut during the grand opening ceremonies for the newly constructed Stax Music Academy building, even before the opening of the Stax Museum (opened in May 2003) because the need for positive youth programming in Soulsville USA was more urgent than even the need for the Stax Museum.

In 2004, the Stax Music Academy hosted its Summer Music Camp Grand Finale concert at Memphis’ Orpheum Theater with special guest Mavis Staples of Stax Records icons the Staple Singers. In 2006, the Stax Music Academy embarked on its first-ever Summer Soul Tour Presented by FedEx, opening the festivities at the prestigious Porretta Soul Festival in Porretta Terme, Italy and toured the country with visits to Rome, Florence, and other cities. It was the first international trip for the academy. The following year, the Stax Music Academy traveled on its first domestic Summer Soul Tour Presented by FedEx performing at Cleveland's Rock and Roll Hall of Fame, Kennedy Center in Washington, D.C., and other venues in Pittsburg and Philadelphia. The 2008 Stax Music Academy Summer Soul Tour Presented by FedEx took students on a concert and cultural tour of Australia with stops in Melbourne, the capital city of Canberra, and Sydney. Students performed public and private concerts, engaged in workshops with Aboriginal students and patients at Royal Children's Hospitals, performed for consulate general and staff, and were treated to tea at the embassy residence of then United States Ambassador to Australia The Honorable Robert McCallum.

In 2008, all Stax Music Academy seniors are accepted to college, which happens every year from to then to present.

Students of the Stax Music Academy went on to open for B.B. King at his annual King Homecoming Festival in his hometown of Indianola, Mississippi; performed at the national AARP convention in Orlando with Stax legend William Bell and at Disney World (other AARP entertainers included Gladys Knight, B.B. King, Gloria Gaynor, Los Lobos, and Judy Collins; and were featured artists at the nationally televised 19th Annual Trumpet Awards in Atlanta, GA.

In June 2011, Stax Music Academy performed for five days to a collective audience over 1 million people at the Smithsonian Folklife Festival on the National Mall in Washington, D.C. during the festival's first ever salute to R&B music. That same year students performed at Lincoln Center in New York City as part of their Summer Soul Tour and were featured

for the first time on NBC Today show in a segment with former First Daughter Jenna Bush Hager.

In 2012, the Stax Music Academy performed two concerts in Berlin, Germany during the opening of “Memphis Exhibition Berlin” and perform for then-United States Ambassador The Honorable Philip D. Murphy, his wife Tammy Snyder Murphy, staff, media, and the general public. That same year performances included shows at Berklee College of Music in Boston and Levitt Pavilion in Westport, Connecticut with special guests GRAMMY© Award-winning artist Kirk Whalum and Vaneese Thomas, daughter of legendary Rufus Thomas. The following year the academy embarked on a tour with performances at Morgan Freeman's Ground Zero Blues Club in Clarksdale, Mississippi. B.B. King's Club Ebony in Indianola, Mississippi, and a concert in conjunction with the Tipatina Foundation in New Orleans at famed Tipitina's Nightclub.

The following year, the Stax Music Academy forms its first alumni band as a way to keep its former students in the ‘Stax Music Academy family,’ provide them with paid summer employment, further hone their musical performance skills, and offer tourists and locals alike a unique music experience, with summer performances in the Stax Museum of American Soul Music and B.B King's Blues Club on Beale Street. Band is formed each year after through present and is one of the most sought-after acts in Memphis.

In 2016, the Stax Music Academy was invited to perform on the National Mall in Washington, D.C. for three days at the grand opening festival of the Smithsonian's National Museum of African American History and Culture. SMA is again featured on NBC's Today show to millions of viewers, as well as in print and video in USA Today. The following year students went on a concert tour through the UK and France, performing all Stax music to celebrate the 50th anniversary of the 1967 Stax/Volt European Tour with shows in Cahors and Bordeaux, France, and Hitchin, Manchester, London, Milton Keynes, and Gateshead/Newcastle, England. Tour includes live performances on the BBC, major European and American press articles, and garners more than 400 million traditional media and social media impressions. Shares festival stages with Stax icons Mavis Staples, William Bell, and others.

During its almost 20 years of teaching music and mentoring young people, Stax Music Academy students have participated in workshops and performances with a wide variety of GRAMMY©-winning artists, former Stax Records artists, and other music industry professionals including Huey Lewis, Steve Miller, George Clinton, Lalah Hathaway, Steve Cropper, Booker T. Jones, the Bar-Kays, R&B violinist Damien Escobar, Steve Jordon, Bootsy Collins, John Legend, cast of Motown the Musical, cast of MEMPHIS the musical, Marcus Miller, Charles Lloyd, Branford Marsalis, PJ Morton, Kanye West, The Roots, former First Lady Laura Bush, BBC television/radio host Jools Holland, British soul sensation Beverly Knight, Elvis Costello, Candi Staton, George Duke,  members of Janet Jackson's band, former Stax Records owner Al Bell, Stax Records founder Jim Stewart, and numerous others.

See also
The Soulsville Charter School

References

External links
Stax Music Academy website

Education in Memphis, Tennessee
Music schools in Tennessee